The 1951 Miami Hurricanes football team represented the University of Miami as an independent during the 1951 college football season. Led by fourth-year head coach Andy Gustafson, the Hurricanes played their home games at Burdine Stadium in Miami, Florida. Miami finished the season 8–3. The Hurricanes were invited to the Gator Bowl, where they beat Clemson, 14–0.

Schedule

References

Miami
Miami Hurricanes football seasons
Gator Bowl champion seasons
Miami Hurricanes football